The 15th FINA World Championships were held from 20 July to 4 August in Barcelona, Catalonia, Spain. The 2013 World Championships featured 6 aquatics disciplines: swimming, water polo, diving, high diving, open water, and synchronised swimming.

The Championships were originally awarded to Dubai, United Arab Emirates, in July 2009; however, Dubai withdrew as host in May 2010. FINA then re-bid the meet, and Barcelona was selected on September 26, 2010.

Venues
The venues that hosted the events were previously used for the 2003 World Aquatics Championships:
Palau Sant Jordi (swimming, synchronized swimming)
Port Vell (open water swimming, high diving)
Piscina Municipal de Montjuïc (diving)
Piscines Bernat Picornell (water polo)

Schedule
This was the first time the World Aquatic Championships included high diving.

The opening ceremonies took place on July 19, 2013.

All dates are CEST (UTC+2)

Medal table

Competition

Diving

High diving

Open water swimming

On the first day of competition on July 20, American Haley Anderson won the first gold of the competition in the women's 5 km, just beating Brazilian Poliana Okimoto 56:34.2 to 56:34.4. In the second event on day one, Tunisian Oussama Mellouli won the men's 5 km race with a time of 53:30.4.

Swimming

World records
The following world records were established during the competition:

Synchronised swimming

Water polo

Participating nations
181 nations entered the competition. Ecuador, currently suspended by FINA, participated under the FINA flag as independent athletes.

Notes and references

External links

Official event website

 
2013
World Aquatics Championships
2013 World Aquatics Championships
2013 World Aquatics Championships
World Aquatics Championships
World Aquatics Championships
World Aquatics Championships